The Greek community in Australia has contributed greatly to Australian soccer with many clubs being founded by local Greek Communities.

Clubs by state/territory

Australian Capital Territory

New South Wales

Northern Territory

Queensland

South Australia

Tasmania

Victoria

Western Australia

See also

List of sports clubs inspired by others
List of Croatian soccer clubs in Australia
List of Italian Soccer clubs in Australia
List of Serbian soccer clubs in Australia

References

Greek-Australian culture
Greece
Australia

Greek
Greek Soccer clubs